Jennifer McGregor is an Australian operatic soprano. Her album The Jennifer McGregor Album, recorded with the West Australian Symphony Orchestra, was nominated for the 1988 ARIA Award for Best Classical Album.

Born in Sydney, she is the sister of actress Julie McGregor. She joined the chorus of the Australian Opera in 1981 and became a principal after winning the Metropolitan Opera Audition Scholarship and the Armstrong-Martin Scholarship and studying in Europe. She left the opera in 1986. From 1988 to 1990 she was a principal with Germany's Heidelberg Opera. Together with Judi Connelli and Suzanne Johnston she formed the 3 Divas. In 2000 they released a self-titled album.

Discography

Albums

Awards and nominations

ARIA Music Awards
The ARIA Music Awards is an annual awards ceremony that recognises excellence, innovation, and achievement across all genres of Australian music. They commenced in 1987. 

! 
|-
| 1989
| The Jennifer McGregor Album
| Best Classical Album
| 
| 
|-

References

External links
Biographical cuttings on Jennifer McGregor, soprano at the National Library of Australia

Year of birth missing (living people)
Living people
Australian operatic sopranos
Singers from Sydney